Frank Hsia-San Shu (born June 2, 1943), is a Chinese-American astrophysicist, astronomer and author. He is currently a University Professor Emeritus at the University of California, Berkeley and University of California, San Diego. He is best known for proposing the density wave theory to explain the structure of spiral galaxies, and for describing a model of star formation, where a giant dense molecular cloud collapses to form a star.

Early life and education 
Shu's hometown is Wenzhou, Zhejiang, but he was born in Kunming ,Yunnan, in 1943. His father, Shu Shien-Siu, was a mathematician and an instructor at the National Tsing Hua University, which, at that time due to World War II, was temporarily relocated to Kunming from Beijing. The senior Shu would serve as the President of the National Tsing Hua University from 1970 to 1975. When Shu was 2 months old, his father went to the United States for study and, later, work. Shu and his family went to Taiwan through Hong Kong when he was 5 years old, stayed there for a year, and then traveled by steamship to the United States to re-unite with the senior Shu, who was working at the Illinois Institute of Technology, Chicago.

Shu completed his BSc in physics in 1963 at the Massachusetts Institute of Technology (MIT). While at MIT, he worked one summer for Chia-Chiao Lin on the structure of spiral galaxies, and the experience made him interested in astrophysics. He later continued working with Lin for his PhD project, as Max Krook, his formal doctoral supervisor at Harvard University, gave him freedom in his PhD research. He obtained his PhD from Harvard in 1968.

Over his PhD study, he built on his undergraduate work and, together with Lin, proposed the density wave theory and published several articles explaining the structure of spiral galaxies.

Career 
After his PhD, Shu joined the Stony Brook University as an assistant professor, and was promoted to associate professor in 1971. He moved to the University of California, Berkeley in 1973, and became a full professor in 1976. He had a brief visit at the Institute for Advanced Study in 1982. Between 1984 and 1988, he was the chair, or Head, of the Department of Astronomy.

From 1994 to 1996, Shu was also the President of the American Astronomical Society (AAS).

Shu was named a University Professor of the University of California (UC) system in 1998, an honour that at the time was only endowed to 19 faculty members across the UC system.

In 2002, Shu followed in his father's footsteps and went to Taiwan to take up the position of the President of the National Tsing Hua University, returning to the United States and joining the University of California, San Diego as a distinguished professor in 2006.

Shu officially retired in 2009, becoming a University Professor Emeritus of the UC system, and a Distinguished Research Fellow at the Academia Sinica Institute of Astronomy and Astrophysics (until 2015).

Currently, Shu is also an Emeritus Senior Fellow at the Hong Kong Institute for Advanced Study of the City University of Hong Kong.

Shu has written 3 textbooks: Physical Universe: An Introduction to Astronomy, The Physics of Astrophysics Vol. I: Radiation and The Physics of Astrophysics Vol. II: Gas Dynamics.

Research 
Shu is best known for his work in spiral galaxies and star formation. He, together with his PhD supervisor Chia-Chiao Lin, proposed the density wave theory to explain the structure of spiral galaxies. In 1977, he published a model, known as the "inside-out" collapse model or the "singular isothermal sphere" model, of star formation, whereby a star forms when a giant dense molecular cloud collapses.

Honors and awards 
 Helen B. Warner Prize for Astronomy (1977)
 Member of the National Academy of Sciences (1987)
 Academician of the Academia Sinica, Taiwan (1990)
 Fellow of the American Academy of Arts and Sciences (1992)
 Brouwer Award (1996)
 Dannie Heineman Prize for Astrophysics (2000)
 Member of the American Philosophical Society (2003)
 Foreign Associate of the Royal Astronomical Society (2006)
 Member of The World Academy of Sciences (2006)
 Centennial Medal, Graduate School of Arts and Sciences, Harvard University (2008)
 Shaw Prize in Astronomy (2009)
 Bruce Medal (2009)

The main-belt asteroid 18238 Frankshu is named after Shu.

References

External links 
 

Living people
1943 births
American astronomers
American science writers
Chinese emigrants to the United States
Educators from Yunnan
Fellows of the American Association for the Advancement of Science
Harvard Graduate School of Arts and Sciences alumni
MIT Department of Physics alumni
Members of Academia Sinica
Members of the United States National Academy of Sciences
People from Kunming
Stony Brook University faculty
University of California, Berkeley faculty
University of California, San Diego faculty
Writers from Yunnan
Winners of the Dannie Heineman Prize for Astrophysics
Presidents of National Tsing Hua University
Fellows of the Royal Astronomical Society
Members of the American Philosophical Society